The Pidkamin massacre or the Podkamień massacre of 12 March 1944 was the massacre of Polish civilians committed by the Ukrainian Insurgent Army (UPA) under the command of Maksym Skorupsky (Maks), in cooperation with a unit of the 14th SS-Volunteer Division "Galician". The victims were ethnic Polish residents of the Eastern Galician village of Podkamień in the occupied Second Polish Republic's Tarnopol Voivodeship (now Pidkamin, Zolochiv Raion, Ukraine). During the war the area was administratively part of the Nazi German Reichskommissariat Ukraine (now Ternopil Oblast). Estimates of victims include 150, more than 250   and up to 1000.

Prelude
During World War II Pidkamin,, was a shelter for Poles from the neighbouring province of Volhynia, who had escaped the Massacres of Poles in Volhynia and sought refuge in the local Dominican monastery. The complex was surrounded by walls and was located on a hill that dominated the surrounding area and as a result provided a relatively safe haven for refugees. Around 2,000 people were living at Podkamin town and the monastery when it was attacked in March 1944, by the UIA in cooperation with 14th SS Division.

The massacre
On the first day of the attack it was repelled by a small self-defence group, and that night some of the inhabitants managed to escape. The next day the UIA promised to spare the inhabitants lives in exchange for the surrender of the monastery.  While the monastery was being evacuated the UIA opened fire and entered the monastery complex, and massacred a number of people, including the clergy. The bodies of the dead were then thrown into the well. Afterwards the UIA camped in the nearby town of Pidkamin, and between the 12–16 March repeatedly attacked people hiding in the villages. On 16 March, as the Soviet Red Army approached, the UIA withdrew from the area.

Aftermath
Approximately 100 ethnic Poles were murdered in the monastery, and additional 500 were killed in the town of Pidkamen itself. In the nearby village of Palikrowy, 365 Poles were killed. Armed Ukrainian groups destroyed the monastery, stealing all the valuables, except for the monastery's crowned icon. Tadeusz Piotrowski who based his findings on the Home Army or German Police sources, estimates that the number of victims in the monastery and adjacent villages numbered 1000. Among the survivors was the renowned writer and painter, Leopold Buczkowski.

Footnotes

See also

 Historiography of the Volyn tragedy
 Massacres of Poles in Volhynia
 Huta Pieniacka massacre
 Chodaczkow Wielki massacre
 Palikrowy massacre

Sources
 Grzegorz Motyka, Ukraińska Partyzantka 1942–1960, Warszawa 2006. Pages: 182, 385.
 Per Anders Rudling, They Defended Ukraine’: The 14. Waffen-Grenadier-Division der SS (Galizische Nr. 1) Revisited, The Journal of Slavic Military Studies, 25:3, 329-368 online version

External links
From Hiding Place to Hiding Place by Regina Hader Rock. Recollections of a Jewish survivor of the war, living in the area of Podkamien
A webpage of former Polish inhabitants of the town
List of Poles murdered by Ukrainian nationalists in Podkamien and neighboring villages

1944 in Poland
Mass murder in 1944
Massacres in 1944
World War II massacres
Poland in World War II
World War II crimes in Poland
Massacres of Poles in Eastern Galicia
Pidkamin
March 1944 events